Sture Henriksson (1917–1957) was a Swedish social democrat politician who committed suicide in 1957 while serving as the minister of communications (Transport).

Biography
Henriksson was a member of the Social Democratic Party and served at the Swedish Parliament. In 1949 he was one of the members of the tax commission at the Parliament. He edited the monthly journal of the Social Democratic Party entitled Tiden between 1956 and 1957. He committed suicide while he was serving as the minister of communications (Transport) in 1957. The event occurred after Henriksson was arrested for drunkenness. His colleague Östen Undén later accused a journalist in Expressen of his death.

References

20th-century Swedish politicians
1917 births
1957 deaths
Members of the Riksdag from the Social Democrats
Politicians who committed suicide
Swedish Ministers for Communications
Swedish magazine editors